Manas Chaudhuri is an Indian journalist and the former editor of Shillong Times, an English-language daily published from the Meghalayan capital of Shillong. He won as a legislator to the Shillong Assembly twice from Mawprem constituency as an independent candidate.
. He is a former cabinet minister of the State and served Shillong Times as its Editor from 1978 to 2008, when he resigned from the post for Patricia Mukhim to take over. The Government of India awarded him the fourth highest civilian honour of the Padma Shri, in 2005, for his contributions to Indian journalism. He is the founder of the Ardhendu Chaudhuri Charitable Trust.

Sri Manas Chaudhuri is former editor of The Shillong Times since 1978, for 30 years he has almost single-handedly brought it up as Meghalaya's premier English Daily. He has earned respect in the field of journalism in the Northeast in general and Meghalaya in particular, on one hand, for his courageous exposes of corruption in high places and, on the other, for his fiercely independent, but liberal, editorial policy.

Sri Chaudhuri is the founding President of the Shillong Press Club and Past President of Meghalaya Editors' & Publishers' Association. He is a Member of the Selection Committee of the Media Exchange Programme of the National Foundation for India, New Delhi.

He is associated with a host of educational and cultural institutions of Shillong. He has been the Honorary Secretary of the Rilbong PN Chaudhuri Secondary School, Shillong uninterruptedly for 40 years (which is a record of sorts) and helped the school grow almost from a scratch to a position of respectability. He is the President of the Governing Body of the Lady Keane Girls' Higher Secondary School. Sri Chaudhuri is a Trustee of Sri Aurobindo Institute of Indian Culture. He is the President of the Rilbong Sports & Cultural Club, one of the most active youth organisations of Meghalaya engaged in multi-dimensional social, cultural and sports activities. Sri Chaudhuri is a Past District Governor of Rotary International District 3240 and a Past Master of the Freemasons' Lodge. In 1998 he led Rotary International's Group Study Exchange Team from District 3240 to Ohio, USA. He also led a Rotary Friendship Mission to Bangladesh in 1996.

Sri Chaudhuri was part of the Prime Minister's Press entourage to Pakistan, Thailand, UK, Cuba, Philippines, Russia, Germany, Brazil and US with Dr. Manmohan Singh.

He is the recipient of the Padmashree Award in 2005, "Pride of Shillong" Award instituted by Geetali---a reputed cultural organisation of Shillong.

He was elected as a Member of the Meghalaya Legislative Assembly in 2005 as an independent candidate securing 52% popular votes. In 2008, he was re-elected with a thumping margin; and served as a Cabinet Minister holding portfolios like Higher & Technical Education, Information & Public Relations etc. During his tenure as Minister, he took a number of measures to reform education system of Meghalaya. Introduction of pension benefits of college teachers and lecturers, creation of girls’ hostels, construction of lavatories, libraries, and creation of music university in Shillong. It was during his tenure that Meghalaya's Education Policy was adopted and implemented. In 2013, he contested the Meghalaya Legislative Assembly elections as a candidate of the Indian National Congress (INC) from South Shillong and lost to Sanbor Shullai. He again lost the 2018 Meghalaya Legislative Assembly elections to Shullai, who this time was a BJP candidate.

With a view to maintaining transparency and probity to public life, Sri Chaudhuri provided full statement of accounts of all the money received by him as an MLA and their appropriation. This initiative was lauded by no less a person, the then Prime Minister of India, Dr. Manmohan Singh.

He is the Managing Trustee of Ardhendu Chaudhuri Charitable Trust (created to perpetuate the memory of his brother who died in helicopter crash while on tour as an MLA). The Trust has been undertaking multifarious welfare activities in the spirit of “Service Above Self” out of his personal contributions. He is one of few elected public representatives in the country who donated all his earnings as MLA for serving the less fortunate. He has conceived and implemented a unique initiative called “Aahar” under which some 300 poor and hungry people are being provided with a wholesome free meal every day. The project enters its 100th day of existence on 1 January 2019. The entire cost of this project is being borne out of his personal contribution to the ACCT, under whose banner, project Aahar is alive and kicking.

He is happily married to Shobha Chaudhuri and the couple is blessed with three children--- Shreya, Esha, and Aneesh.

See also 
 Shillong Times

References 

Recipients of the Padma Shri in literature & education
Living people
Indian male journalists
Meghalaya MLAs 2013–2018
Meghalaya politicians
Journalists from Meghalaya
People from Shillong
Year of birth missing (living people)